Shane "Choppa" Chapman (born 4 July 1978) is a New Zealand super middleweight kickboxer and boxer, fighting out of City Lee Gar Gym in Auckland. He is the 2002 and 2004 K-1 Oceania MAX champion and 4 time Muay Thai World champion.

Biography and career

Shane Chapman made his amateur kickboxing debut in 1995 aged 19, winning by TKO.  Between 1995 and the latter half of 1997 he had a successful amateur career on the local circuit, winning 8 out of 9 fights and picking up the New Zealand North Island and South Pacific titles at super welterweight.  On 18 September 1997 he made his professional Muay Thai debut defeating Norm Graham over 5 rounds at a domestic event in Auckland, New Zealand.  In 1998 he won his first professional (and world) title by defeating a Chinese fighter to win the W.F.S.B. world title at light middleweight.  He followed this up later in the year to claim his second world title in Hong Kong – this time it was the H.K.M.T.A. belt.  Chapman was now a double world champion at just 19 years old.

By the turn of the millennium Chapman was facing stronger and stronger fighters from Thailand, Japan and Australia.   Between the end of 1999 and throughout the majority of 2001, he went undefeated, winning 14 fights against opposition such as John Wayne Parr, Akeomi Nitta and Thai world champion Dejpayak Sasirapa, winning the Judgement Day 1 "Australasian Super 8" tournament, and the W.M.C. Asia-Pacific and I.S.S. Brute Force titles.  His record ended on 15 August 2001 where he was stopped in the final of the Judgement 2 tournament by multiple Muay Thai and kickboxing world champion Daniel Dawson.  At the end of 2001, Chapman made his K-1 MAX debut at the inaugural K-1 Oceania MAX 2001 tournament in Melbourne, Australia, with the prize being a place at the first ever K-1 MAX world final – an event for middleweight kickboxers (70 kg).  Chapman won the tournament by defeating all three opponents via decision and booked his place in Tokyo as the Oceania regional winner.  At the K-1 World MAX 2002 Chapman faced Albert Kraus in the quarter finals.  After three rounds it was eventual champion Kraus who had his hand raised - beating Shane by a close but unanimous decision after three rounds.

Chapman returned to K-1 MAX at the K-1 Oceania MAX 2002 event but the reigning champion could only make the semi finals, losing to John Wayne Parr via knockout in a rematch of their 2000 bout which Shane had won.  In 2003 he signed up with the newly created Austrian promotion SuperLeague and defeated Muay Thai champion Ole Laursen on his debut.  Later that year he entered the second ever K-1 MAX New Zealand event, making the final but losing to Jordan Tai by a close split decision after three rounds.  He lost his next couple of SuperLeague fights to Yoshihiro Sato and Kamal El Amrani but did manage to win his third world title – claiming the W.K.B.F. Muay Thai middleweight belt.  He would also make his professional boxing debut that year and would have two matches (winning both) against local opposition.

After his defeat to El Amrani, Chapman went on another winning streak defeating nine opponents including victories against top level fighters such as Jean-Charles Skarbowsky, Arslan Magomedov and Ramazan Ramazanov.  He also booked his place at the K-1 World MAX 2005 Open by winning his second K-1 MAX Oceania title in 2004.  His winning streak ended at the elimination round in Tokyo, where he lost to rival and close friend John Wayne Parr in the last match of their trilogy of fights.  With this defeat Shane would be unable to qualify for the K-1 World MAX final and would have his last bout with K-1, finishing 10 and 4 with the organization.  By the end of 2005 he won his fourth world title by defeating legendary Thai Lamsongkram Chuwattana in Hong Kong to claim the H.K.M.T.A. Muay Thai middleweight belt.

In 2006, Chapman returned to SuperLeague defeating Petr Polak and dropping a close decision to multiple world champion Dmitry Shakuta.  These would be his last fights with the SuperLeague organization (which folded later that year), finishing with a 2 and 4 record in a very competitive 76 kg division.  During the second half of the year, Chapman won the S-1 Oceania tournament in what would be his last major kickboxing title.  During 2007 he would have a number of kickboxing bouts, with notable draws against Cosmo Alexandre and Eugune Ekkelboom respectively but was becoming more and more focused on his pro boxing career.  In 2008 he would have his first shot at a boxing title but came up short against Daniel McKinnon who retained his W.B.O. Oriental super middleweight belt after twelve rounds.

Titles 
2006 S-1 Oceania tournament champion -72.5 kg
2005 H.K.M.T.A. Muay Thai Middleweight World champion -72.5 kg
2004 K-1 Oceania MAX champion -70 kg
2004 W.K.B.F. Muay Thai Middleweight World Champion -72.5 kg
2003 K-1 MAX New Zealand runner up -70 kg
2001 K-1 Oceania MAX champion -70 kg
2001 Judgement Day 2 "Super 8 Eliminator" tournament runner up -70 kg
2000 I.S.S. Brute Force champion -72 kg
2000 W.M.C. Asia-Pacific Light Middleweight champion -70 kg
2000 Judgement Day 1 "Australasian Super 8" tournament champion -70 kg
1998 H.K.M.T.A. Muay Thai Light Middleweight World champion -70 kg
1998 W.F.S.B. Light Middleweight World champion -70 kg
1997 South Pacific Super Welterweight Amateur champion -69.5 kg
1997 W.M.T.C. New Zealand North Island Super Welterweight Amateur champion -69.5 kg

Fight record 

|-
|-  bgcolor="#CCFFCC"
| 2008-07-29 || Win ||align=left| Daniel Kerr || Philip Lam Promotion || Auckland, New Zealand || TKO (Referee Stoppage) || 1 || || 65-18-5-1
|-
|-  bgcolor="#CCFFCC"
| 2008-02-23 || Win ||align=left| Sornchai Jarondee || Sifu's Super Saturday Vol. 4 || Auckland, New Zealand || Decision || 5 || 3:00 || 64-18-5-1 
|-
|-  bgcolor="#c5d2ea"
| 2007-09-03 || Draw ||align=left| Eugene Ekkelboom || S-1 Oceania Championship 2007 || Auckland, New Zealand || Decision Draw || 5 || 3:00 || 63-18-5-1
|-
! style=background:white colspan=9 |
|-
|-  bgcolor="#CCFFCC"
| 2007-10-13 || Win ||align=left| Kongsuriya || Rise of The Sun - "Double the Danger" || Papatoetoe, New Zealand || KO (Right Hook) || 1 || || 63-18-4-1
|-
|-  bgcolor="#CCFFCC"
| 2007-10-13 || Win ||align=left| Lerdmongkon Sor Tarntip || Rise of The Sun - "Double the Danger" || Papatoetoe, New Zealand || Decision || 3 || 3:00  || 62-18-4-1
|-
|-  bgcolor="#c5d2ea"
| 2007-09-03 || Draw ||align=left| Cosmo Alexandre || Philip Lam Promotion || Auckland, New Zealand || Decision Draw || 5 || 3:00 || 61-18-4-1
|-
|-  bgcolor="#CCFFCC"
| 2007-05-27 || Win ||align=left| Si Nonachai || Melbourne Town Hall || Melbourne, Australia || Decision || 5 || 3:00  || 61-18-3-1
|-
|-  bgcolor="#CCFFCC"
| 2007-03-25 || Win ||align=left| Dimitri Borulko || Melbourne Town Hall || Melbourne, Australia || Decision || 5 || 3:00  || 60-18-3-1
|-
|-  bgcolor="#CCFFCC"
| 2007-03-03 || Win ||align=left| Locthunan || Philip Lam Promotion || Auckland, New Zealand || Decision || 5 || 3:00 || 59-18-3-1 
|-
|-  bgcolor="#CCFFCC"
| 2006-12-16 || Win ||align=left| Alain Sylvestre || Philip Lam Promotion || Auckland, New Zealand || TKO (Corner Stoppage) || 2 ||  || 58-18-3-1
|-
|-  bgcolor="#CCFFCC"
| 2006-09-02 || Win ||align=left| Wanlop Sitpholek || S-1 Oceania 2006, Final || Auckland, New Zealand || KO (Right Hook) || 2 ||  || 57-18-3-1
|-
! style=background:white colspan=9 |
|-
|-  bgcolor="#CCFFCC"
| 2006-09-02 || Win ||align=left| Warren Elson || S-1 Oceania 2006, Semi Finals || Auckland, New Zealand || Decision || 3 || 3:00 || 56-18-3-1
|-
|-  bgcolor="#CCFFCC"
| 2006-09-02 || Win ||align=left| Mot Eck Muangsenaa || S-1 Oceania 2006, Quarter Finals || Auckland, New Zealand || Decision || 3 || 3:00 || 55-18-3-1
|-
|-  bgcolor="#CCFFCC"
| 2006-07-29 || Win ||align=left| Saitan Kaikorwit || Philip Lam Promotion || Auckland, New Zealand || Decision || 5 || 3:00 || 54-18-3-1
|-
|-  bgcolor="#CCFFCC"
| 2006-06-24 || Win ||align=left| Arslan Magomedov || K-1 Kings of Oceania 2006 Round 1, Super Fight || Auckland, New Zealand || Decision || 3 || 3:00 || 53-18-3-1
|-
|-  bgcolor="#FFBBBB"
| 2006-05-13 || Loss ||align=left| Dmitry Shakuta || SuperLeague Elimination 2006, Super Fight || Vienna, Austria || Decision || 3 || 3:00 || 52-18-3-1
|-
|-  bgcolor="#CCFFCC"
| 2006-03-11 || Win ||align=left| Petr Polak || SuperLeague Apocalypse 2006 || Paris, France || Decision || 3 || 3:00 || 52-17-3-1
|-
|-  bgcolor="#c5d2ea"
| 2006-02-? || Draw ||align=left| Phosai Sitpatong || City Lee Gar - YMCA || Auckland, New Zealand || Decision Draw || 5 || 3:00 || 51-17-3-1
|-
|-  bgcolor="#CCFFCC"
| 2005-11-18 || Win ||align=left| Muayyak Chuwattana || Lee Gar 30th Anniversary || Auckland, New Zealand || KO || 3 || || 51-17-2-1
|-
|-  bgcolor="#CCFFCC"
| 2005-08-30 || Win ||align=left| Lamsongkram Chuwattana || H.K.M.T.A. Hong Kong Championships || Hong Kong || Decision (Split) || 5 || 3:00 || 50-17-2-1
|-
! style=background:white colspan=9 |
|-
|-  bgcolor="#c5d2ea"
| 2005-07-30 || NC ||align=left| Alain Sylvestre || K-1 Kings of Oceania 2005 Round 1, Super Fight || Auckland, New Zealand || No Contest (Injury) || 1 || 3:00 || 49-17-2-1
|-
|-  bgcolor="#CCFFCC"
| 2005-07-16 || Win ||align=left| Yodkhunsuk Kaewsamrit || Philip Lam Promotion - YMCA || Auckland, New Zealand || KO || 5 || || 49-17-2 
|-
|-  bgcolor="#FFBBBB"
| 2005-05-21 || Loss ||align=left| Kamal El Amrani || SuperLeague Germany 2005 || Oberhausen, Germany || Disqualification (Kick to Groin) || 5 || || 48-17-2
|-
|-  bgcolor="#FFBBBB"
| 2005-05-04 || Loss ||align=left| John Wayne Parr || K-1 World MAX 2005 Open || Tokyo, Japan || KO (Left Punch) || 3 || 2:08 || 48-16-2
|-
! style=background:white colspan=9 |
|-
|-  bgcolor="#CCFFCC"
| 2005-04-02 || Win ||align=left| Nuengtakang Por.Muang Ubon || International Fight Night || Auckland, New Zealand || Decision || 5 || 3:00 || 48-15-2
|-
|-  bgcolor="#CCFFCC"
| 2005-02-18 || Win ||align=left| Painiran Asani || Philip Lam Promotion - "Fight of the Century" || Auckland, New Zealand || KO || 4 || || 47-15-2
|-
|-  bgcolor="#CCFFCC"
| 2004-12-18 || Win ||align=left| Ramazan Ramazanov || K-1 Challenge 2004 Oceania vs World || Gold Coast, Australia || Decision || 3 || 3:00 || 46-15-2
|-
|-  bgcolor="#CCFFCC"
| 2004-11-05 || Win ||align=left| Hamid Boujaoub || K-1 Oceania MAX 2004, Final || Auckland, New Zealand || Ext.R Decision || 4 || 3:00 || 45-15-2
|-
! style=background:white colspan=9 |
|-
|-  bgcolor="#CCFFCC"
| 2004-11-05 || Win ||align=left| Arslan Magomedov || K-1 Oceania MAX 2004, Semi Finals || Auckland, New Zealand || TKO || 1 || || 44-15-2
|-
|-  bgcolor="#CCFFCC"
| 2004-11-05 || Win ||align=left| Dwayne Glasgow || K-1 Oceania MAX 2001, Quarter Finals || Auckland, New Zealand || KO (Body Punch) || 1 ||  || 43-15-2
|-
|-  bgcolor="#CCFFCC"
| 2004-09-25 || Win ||align=left| Jean-Charles Skarbowsky || NZ vs France || Auckland, New Zealand || Decision || 5 || 3:00 || 42-15-2
|-
|-  bgcolor="#CCFFCC"
| 2004-08-28 || Win ||align=left| Robert Kaennorasing || Philip Lam Promotion || Wellington, New Zealand || Decision || 5 || 3:00 || 41-15-2
|-
|-  bgcolor="#CCFFCC"
| 2004-04-23 || Win ||align=left| Ashley White || K-1 Battle of Anzacs 2004 || Auckland, New Zealand || KO || 2 ||  || 40-15-2
|-
|-  bgcolor="#FFBBBB"
| 2004-03-20 || Loss ||align=left| Kamal El Amrani || SuperLeague Italy 2004 || Padova, Italy || KO (Kick to Liver) || 3 || 1:45 || 39-15-2
|-
|-  bgcolor="#CCFFCC"
| 2004-02-28 || Win ||align=left| Chaowalit Jockygym || Philip Lam Promotion || New Zealand || Decision || 5 || 3:00 || 39-14-2
|-
! style=background:white colspan=9 |
|-
|-  bgcolor="#FFBBBB"
| 2003-12-06 || Loss ||align=left| Yoshihiro Sato || SuperLeague Netherlands 2003 || Rotterdam, Netherlands || TKO (Doc Stop/Cut Shin) || 2 || 3:00 || 38-14-2
|-
|-  bgcolor="#FFBBBB"
| 2003-11-07 || Loss ||align=left| Jordan Tai || K-1 MAX New Zealand 2003, Final || Auckland, New Zealand || Decision (Split) || 3 || 3:00 || 38-13-2
|-
! style=background:white colspan=9 |
|-
|-  bgcolor="#CCFFCC"
| 2003-11-07 || Win ||align=left| Aaron Boyes || K-1 MAX New Zealand 2003, Semi Finals || Auckland, New Zealand || KO (Knee Strike) || 1 || || 38-12-2
|-
|-  bgcolor="#CCFFCC"
| 2003-11-07 || Win ||align=left| Lance Seranke || K-1 MAX New Zealand 2003, Quarter Finals || Auckland, New Zealand || TKO (Referee Stoppage) || 2 ||  || 37-12-2
|-
|-  bgcolor="#CCFFCC"
| 2003-06-28 || Win ||align=left| Dominic Devanna || Hamilton Casino Bar || Hamilton, New Zealand || Decision (Unanimous) || 5 || 3:00 || 36-12-2
|-
|-  bgcolor="#CCFFCC"
| 2003-06-01 || Win ||align=left| Kenichi Ogata || Shootboxing - S of the World Vol 3 || Tokyo, Japan || Decision (Unanimous) || 5 || 3:00 || 35-12-2
|-
|-  bgcolor="#CCFFCC"
| 2003-05-10 || Win ||align=left| Ole Laursen || SuperLeague Austria 2003 || Vienna, Austria || Decision (Unanimous) || 3 || 3:00 || 34-12-2
|-
|-  bgcolor="#FFBBBB"
| 2003-04-13 || Loss ||align=left| Andy Souwer || Shootboxing - S of the World Vol 2 || Tokyo, Japan || Ext. R Disq. (Low Blow) || 6 || 1:01 || 33-12-2
|-
|-  bgcolor="#CCFFCC"
| 2003-02-02 || Win ||align=left| Hiroyuki Doi || Shootboxing - S of the World Vol 1 || Tokyo, Japan || Decision || 5 || 3:00 || 33-11-2
|-
|-  bgcolor="#FFBBBB"
| 2002-11-26 || Loss ||align=left| John Wayne Parr || K-1 Oceania MAX 2002, Semi Finals || Melbourne, Australia || KO (Straight Right Punch) || 3 || || 32-11-2
|-
|-  bgcolor="#CCFFCC"
| 2002-11-26 || Win ||align=left| Ryland Mahoney || K-1 Oceania MAX 2002, Quarter Finals || Melbourne, Australia || Decision || 3 || 3:00 || 32-10-2
|-
|-  bgcolor="#FFBBBB"
| 2002-10-17 || Loss ||align=left| Chao A Leut || Fanta & Audy Promotion || Auckland, New Zealand || Decision (Split) || 5 || 3:00 || 31-10-2
|-
! style=background:white colspan=9 |
|-
|-  bgcolor="#FFBBBB"
| 2003-?-? || Loss ||align=left| Jeremy Allen || Judgement Day 3, Semi Finals || Melbourne, Australia || Decision || 3 || 3:00 || 31-9-2
|-
|-  bgcolor="#CCFFCC"
| 2003-?-? || Win ||align=left| Alexei Perkachyk || Judgement Day 3, Quarter Finals || Melbourne, Australia || Decision (Unanimous) || 3 || 3:00 || 31-8-2
|-
|-  bgcolor="#FFBBBB"
| 2002-07-25 || Loss ||align=left| Sagetdaw Kiatputon || New Zealand vs Thailand || New Zealand || Decision || 5 || 3:00 || 30-8-2
|-
|-  bgcolor="#FFBBBB"
| 2002-05-11 || Loss ||align=left| Albert Kraus || K-1 World MAX 2002 Final, Quarter Finals || Tokyo, Japan || Decision (Unanimous) || 3 || 3:00 || 30-7-2
|-
|-  bgcolor="#CCFFCC"
| 2002 || Win ||align=left| Lotchai || || New Zealand || Decision || 5 || 3:00 || 30-6-2
|-
|-  bgcolor="#CCFFCC"
| 2001-11-11 || Win ||align=left| Mike Cope || K-1 Oceania MAX 2001, Final || Melbourne, Australia || Decision || 3 || 3:00 || 29-6-2
|-
! style=background:white colspan=9 |
|-
|-  bgcolor="#CCFFCC"
| 2001-11-11 || Win ||align=left| Alex Tui || K-1 Oceania MAX 2001, Semi Finals || Melbourne, Australia || Decision || 3 || 3:00 || 28-6-2
|-
|-  bgcolor="#CCFFCC"
| 2001-11-11 || Win ||align=left| Dominic Devanna || K-1 Oceania MAX 2001, Quarter Finals || Melbourne, Australia || Decision || 3 || 3:00 || 27-6-2
|-
|-  bgcolor="#FFBBBB"
| 2001-07-15 || Loss ||align=left| Daniel Dawson || Judgement Day 2, Final || Melbourne, Australia || TKO || 2 || || 26-6-2
|-
! style=background:white colspan=9 |
|-
|-  bgcolor="#CCFFCC"
| 2001-07-15 || Win ||align=left| Chris Collard || Judgement Day 2, Semi Finals || Melbourne, Australia || Decision || 3 || 3:00 || 26-5-2
|-
|-  bgcolor="#CCFFCC"
| 2001-07-15 || Win ||align=left| Mike Cope || Judgement Day 2, Quarter Finals || Melbourne, Australia || Decision || 3 || 3:00 || 25-5-2
|-
|-  bgcolor="#CCFFCC"
| 2001-05-19 || Win ||align=left| Norm Graham || First Ever Pro-Mix || Auckland, New Zealand || TKO || 3 ||  || 24-5-2
|-
|-  bgcolor="#CCFFCC"
| 2000-11-30 || Win ||align=left| Gerbrand Takens || New Zealand vs Netherlands || Auckland, New Zealand || Decision || 5 || 3:00 || 23-5-2
|-
|-  bgcolor="#CCFFCC"
| 2000-10-00 || Win ||align=left| Siekarn || ISS Brute Force Challenge || Pattaya, Thailand || Decision || 5 || 3:00 || 22-5-2
|-
! style=background:white colspan=9 |
|-
|-  bgcolor="#CCFFCC"
| 2000-09-13 || Win ||align=left| Akeomi Nitta || AJKF Legend VIII || Tokyo, Japan || Decision || 5 || 3:00  || 21-5-2
|-
|-  bgcolor="#CCFFCC"
| 2000 || Win ||align=left| Dejpayak Sasirapa || || || Decision || 5 || 3:00 || 20-5-2
|-
! style=background:white colspan=9 |
|-
|-  bgcolor="#FFBBBB"
| 2000-06-29 || Loss ||align=left| Chot Choe || KGB Challenge || Auckland, New Zealand || Decision || 5 || 3:00 || 19-5-2
|-
|-  bgcolor="#CCFFCC"
| 2000-02-04 || Win ||align=left| Chris Collard || Judgement Day 1, Final || Melbourne, Australia || Decision (Unanimous || 2 || || 19-4-2
|-
! style=background:white colspan=9 |
|-
|-  bgcolor="#CCFFCC"
| 2000-02-04 || Win ||align=left| John Wayne Parr || Judgement Day 1, Semi Finals || Melbourne, Australia || Decision || 3 || 3:00 || 18-4-2
|-
|-  bgcolor="#CCFFCC"
| 2000-02-04 || Win ||align=left| Bariz Nesif || Judgement Day 1, Quarter Finals || Melbourne, Australia || Decision || 3 || 3:00 || 17-4-2
|-
|-  bgcolor="#CCFFCC"
| 2000-01-27 || Win ||align=left| Satoru Suzuki || "First Fight on the Millenium" || Auckland, New Zealand || KO || 1 ||  || 16-4-2 
|-
|-  bgcolor="#CCFFCC"
| 1999-11-11 || Win ||align=left| Wan Farnadume || KGB Challenge || Auckland, New Zealand || Decision || 5 || 3:00 || 15-4-2 
|-
|-  bgcolor="#CCFFCC"
| 1999-09-09 || Win ||align=left| Srisak || NZ-Aus-Thailand-Japan || Auckland, New Zealand || KO || 3 ||  || 14-4-2
|-
|-  bgcolor="#c5d2ea"
| 1999-05-24 || Draw ||align=left| Akeomi Nitta || New Japan Kickboxing "Achievement 3" || Tokyo, Japan || Decision Draw || 5 || 3:00 || 13-4-2 
|-
|-  bgcolor="#FFBBBB"
| 1999-02-17 || Loss ||align=left| Tarada Makaro || New Zealand vs Japan || Auckland, New Zealand || TKO || 2 || || 13-4-1 
|-
|-  bgcolor="#CCFFCC"
| 1998-11-12 || Win ||align=left| Wahad Putranpar || New Zealand vs Japan || Auckland, New Zealand || TKO || 2 ||  || 13-3-1
|-
|-  bgcolor="#FFBBBB"
| 1998-08-27 || Loss ||align=left| Yanek Marcel || New Zealand vs France + Thailand || Auckland, New Zealand || TKO (Cut) || 1 ||  || 12-3-1
|-
|-  bgcolor="#CCFFCC"
| 1998 || Win ||align=left| || || Hong Kong || TKO || 3 || || 12-2-1 
|-
! style=background:white colspan=9 |
|-
|-  bgcolor="#CCFFCC"
| 1998 || Win ||align=left| || || || KO || 3 ||  || 11-2-1
|-
! style=background:white colspan=9 |
|-
|-  bgcolor="#FFBBBB"
| 1998-01-00 || Loss ||align=left| Rung Thong || New Zealand vs Thailand || Auckland, New Zealand || Decision || 5 || 3:00 || 10-2-1
|-
|-  bgcolor="#FFBBBB"
| ? || Loss ||align=left| || || || Decision || 5 || 3:00 || 10-1-1
|-
|-  bgcolor="#CCFFCC"
| 1997-11-13 || Win ||align=left| Konjak || @ Sunset Palmz || Auckland, New Zealand || Decision || 5 || 3:00 || 10-0-1
|-  bgcolor="#CCFFCC"
| 1997-09-18 || Win ||align=left| Norm Graham || New Zealand vs Australia || Auckland, New Zealand || Decision || 5 || 3:00 || 9-0-1
|-
! style=background:white colspan=9 |
|-
|-  bgcolor="#CCFFCC"
| 1997-07-10 || Win ||align=left| Luke Kempson || @ Mandaley || Auckland, New Zealand || Decision || 5 || 2:00 || 8-0-1
|-
! style=background:white colspan=9 |
|-
|-  bgcolor="#CCFFCC"
| 1997-04-17 || Win ||align=left| David Achook || @ Sunset Palmz || Auckland, New Zealand || KO || 1 ||  || 7-0-1
|-
|-  bgcolor="#CCFFCC"
| 1997-01-00 || Win ||align=left| Drew Petar || New Zealand vs Australia || Auckland, New Zealand || KO || 3 || || 6-0-1
|-
|-  bgcolor="#CCFFCC"
| 1996-11-28 || Win ||align=left| Glen Burton || New Zealand vs Australia || Auckland, New Zealand || Decision || 3 || 2:00 || 5-0-1
|-
! style=background:white colspan=9 |
|-
|-  bgcolor="#CCFFCC"
| 1996-08-01 || Win ||align=left| James Griffiths || New Zealand vs England || Auckland, New Zealand || KO || 3 ||  || 4-0-1
|-
|-  bgcolor="#c5d2ea"
| 1996-06-00 || Draw ||align=left| Steve Ross || New Zealand vs Australia || New Zealand || Decision Draw || 3 || 2:00 || 3-0-1
|-
|-  bgcolor="#CCFFCC"
| 1996-05-10 || Win ||align=left| David Carlisle || New Zealand vs USA || Auckland, New Zealand || Decision || 3 || 2:00  || 3-0
|-
|-  bgcolor="#CCFFCC"
| 1996 || Win ||align=left| Sean Jennings || || New Zealand || KO || 1 ||  || 2-0
|-
|-  bgcolor="#CCFFCC"
| 1995-11-30 || Win ||align=left| Cirilo Drumond || New Zealand vs Australia || Auckland, New Zealand || TKO || 2 || || 1-0
|-
|-
| colspan=9 | Legend:

Boxing record 

|-
|-  bgcolor="#CCFFCC"
| 2010-10-30 || Win ||align=left| Monty Fauea || ASB Stadium || Auckland, New Zealand || KO || 4 ||  || 9-1-1
|-
|-  bgcolor="#CCFFCC"
| 2009-12-05 || Win ||align=left| Areta Gilbert || Headhunters Motorcycle Club || Auckland, New Zealand || Decision (Unanimous) || 6 || 3:00 || 8-1-1
|-
|-  bgcolor="#CCFFCC"
| 2009-11-21 || Win ||align=left| Fale Siaoloa || ASB Stadium || Auckland, New Zealand || Decision (Unanimous) || 6 || 3:00 || 7-1-1
|-
|-  bgcolor="#c5d2ea"
| 2009-10-03 || Draw ||align=left| Soulan Pownceby || Mystery Creek Events Centre || Hamilton, New Zealand || Technical Decision || 3 || 1:40 || 6-1-1
|-
! style=background:white colspan=9 |
|-
|-  bgcolor="#CCFFCC"
| 2008-11-08 || Win ||align=left| Fale Siaoloa || ASB Stadium || Auckland, New Zealand || TKO || 2 || || 6-1
|-
|-  bgcolor="#CCFFCC"
| 2008-10-18 || Win ||align=left| Niusila Seiuli || YMCA Stadium || Auckland, New Zealand || TKO || 3 || || 5-1
|-
|-  bgcolor="#FFBBBB"
| 2008-05-03 || Loss ||align=left| Daniel MacKinnon || Headhunters Motorcycle Club || Auckland, New Zealand || Decision (Unanimous) || 10 || 3:00 || 4-1
|-
! style=background:white colspan=9 |
|-
|-  bgcolor="#CCFFCC"
| 2007-09-28 || Win ||align=left| Niusila Seiuli || Manurewa Netball Centre || Manukau City, New Zealand || Decision (Unanimous) || 4 || 3:00 || 4-0
|-
|-  bgcolor="#CCFFCC"
| 2005-04-16 || Win ||align=left| Charles August || Trusts Stadium || Auckland, New Zealand || KO || 2 || || 3-0
|-
|-  bgcolor="#CCFFCC"
| 2002-12-14 || Win ||align=left| Aaron Boyes || YMCA Stadium || Auckland, New Zealand || Decision || 4 || 3:00 || 2-0
|-
|-  bgcolor="#CCFFCC"
| 2002-08-16 || Win ||align=left| Ionatana Pula || St James Theatre || Auckland, New Zealand || TKO || 3 || || 1-0
|-
|-
| colspan=9 | Legend:

See also 
List of male kickboxers
List of K-1 events

References

External links
Official Shane "Choppa" Chapman website
Choppa's K-1 profile

1978 births
Living people
New Zealand male kickboxers
Middleweight kickboxers
Super-middleweight boxers
New Zealand Muay Thai practitioners
Boxers from Auckland
New Zealand male boxers